Lalor Football Club is an Australian rules football club located 18 km north of Melbourne in the suburb of Lalor, Victoria which has a population of 19,561 c. 2006. The club fields a Senior and a Reserves team and for the 2019 Season fielded a combined U 19's team with North Heidelberg known as Bulldog Bloods and affiliated with the Northern Football Netball League.

Lalor first fielded a senior team in the Panton Hill Football League in 1964. After winning premierships in 1966 and 1967 the club transferred to the Diamond Valley Football League in 1968.

For many years the Kernaghan family were heavily involved in the club, Mrs K was there every week selling raffle tickets while over the years her 7 boys played. She remained active in the club up until her passing in 1994.

Timeline of the Lalor Football Club

1964–1967 Panton Hill Football League
1968–1980 Diamond Valley Football League
1981–2000 Diamond Valley Football League Division One
2001      Diamond Valley Football League Division Two
2002      Diamond Valley Football League Division One
2003–2004 Diamond Valley Football League Division Two
2005–2006 Diamond Valley Football League Division One
2007      Northern Football League Division Two
2008–2010 Northern Football League Division One
2011–2017 Northern Football League Division Two
2018-2019 Northern Football League Division Three
2020      Northern Football League Division Three (Season cancelled due to COVID-19)
2021      Northern Football League Division Three (12 Match Season due to COVID-19)
2022      Northern Football League Division Three

Senior Premierships  (10)
Panton Hill Football League (2):

1966, 1967

Northern Football League (Diamond Valley Football League) (8):
Division 1

1980, 1991, 1992, 1993, 1998.

Division 2

2001, 2004, 2007.

Runners up (6)
Division 1

1982, 1984, 1989, 1994.

Division 2

2003, 2015.

See also
Athas Hrysoulakis, part of the 1998 premiership team.

External links

 Lalor Football Club Website

Northern Football League (Australia) clubs
Australian rules football clubs established in 1955
1955 establishments in Australia
Australian rules football clubs in Melbourne
Sport in the City of Whittlesea